Cow Country (2015) is a novel written under the pseudonym Adrian Jones Pearson and published by Cow Eye Press. It centers on the fortunes of a down-on-his-luck educational administrator at the fictional Cow Eye Community College.

Plot
Built around a cattle industry now in decline, the town of Cow Eye Junction is experiencing a severe drought, a demographic incursion, and an ongoing cultural clash as older residents are displaced by a new wave of outsiders moving in.  The college, meanwhile, is struggling to maintain its accreditation and to reconcile two rival factions: those who eat meat, and those who will not. Hoping to resolve this situation, the college hires the narrator, Charlie, to serve as Special Projects Coordinator. Struggling to find his place in life as a self-described "habitual divorcee and father of nothing," Charlie is repeatedly drawn into outlandish situations over the course of the novel as he tries to help the college achieve regional accreditation, reconcile a divided faculty, and resurrect the college's annual Christmas party.

Authorship controversy
The novel drew attention in September 2015 when critic Art Winslow, the longtime Nation books editor, argued in Harper's Magazine that the novel is the work of American author Thomas Pynchon.  Nate Jones at Vulture argued against Pynchon's authorship; he contacted Penguin Books directly and was reportedly told:  "We are Thomas Pynchon's publisher and this is not a book by Thomas Pynchon."  David Marks at Writer's Quarterly drew on certain consistencies to argue that the work is that of short story writer Jacob M. Appel, noting particularly certain thematic similarities between the novel and Appel's Einstein's Beach House, published within six months of Cow Country.  Marks observed that the website "cowcountry.com" had previously been registered under the name "J. Appel."  Laura Well speculates that the novel is actually a collective work of multiple authors.

On September 12, the Associated Press reported that they had traced the website of the book's publisher, Cow Eye Press, to an author named Anthony Perry.  Critic L. Best noted that Anthony Perry is the name of a journalist who, in the past, has written about conspiracy theories regarding Pynchon in various newspapers, including the Los Angeles Times.  Best also says that "A Perry" is a recurring character in the stories of Jacob Appel. Alex Shepard, writing for the New Republic, presents the best case for identifying the author as A. J. Perry rather than Pynchon.

Reception
Initially, the volume was reviewed only on a limited scale.  The San Francisco Book Review wrote, "With quirky characters and impossible situations, Cow Country handles drought, institutional lunacy, racism, and romance with deft insight, as well as keen-edged satirical commentary."  The Midwest Book Review described it as a "tour de farce." Kirkus called the book "Ambitious in its creation of this kooky world, the book will certainly strike a chord with readers lost in their own wacky arenas of academic bickering."

Awards
In March 2017, it was announced that Cow Country had been included in the long list for the Yasnaya Polyana Foreign Fiction Award, which is given annually by the estate of Leo Tolstoy.

References

2015 American novels
Works of unknown authorship
Works published under a pseudonym
Thomas Pynchon